Alena Alekseeva (born March 6, 1989) is a Russian breaststroke swimmer from Novosibirsk.

References

1989 births
Living people
Russian female swimmers
Russian female breaststroke swimmers
Sportspeople from Novosibirsk
European Aquatics Championships medalists in swimming
Universiade medalists in swimming
Universiade bronze medalists for Russia
Medalists at the 2009 Summer Universiade